TransPanama Trail or TransPanama Hike is a walking trail  in length located in Panama. This hiking trail was opened during 2009  and involves walking, hiking, canoeing and passes through neighboring provinces like the Darién Gap. Rick Morales was the first person to complete TransPanama Trail on 23 September 2011.

See also
 American Discovery Trail

References

External links
 TransPanama Foundation

Lists of hiking trails
Geography of Panama
Tourist attractions in Panama